Henry William Watkins was an Anglican priest, academic and author.

Born in  Abergavenny on 19 January 1844, he was educated at King's College London and Balliol College, Oxford. Ordained in 1870  his first post was as a curate at St Nicholas, Pluckley after which he was Vicar of Holy Trinity, Much Wenlock. He was a censor, tutor and lecturer in Greek Testament at King's College London from 1875 and Professor of Logic and Moral Philosophy from 1877. He became Warden of  St Augustine's College, Canterbury in 1879; then held the three archdeaconries of the Diocese of Durham in quick succession: Archdeacon of Northumberland, 1880–June 1882; Archdeacon of Auckland, June–November 1882; and Archdeacon of Durham, November 1882 – 1922. He was Professor of Hebrew at Durham University, retiring in 1920; and the Bampton Lecturer at Oxford, in 1890.

He died at Brighton on 31 August 1922.

Notes

 

 

1844 births
1922 deaths
People from Abergavenny
Alumni of King's College London
Alumni of Balliol College, Oxford
Academics of King's College London
Archdeacons of Auckland
Archdeacons of Durham
Archdeacons of Northumberland
Chaplains of King's College London